John McEffer Shera (1840 – 19 September 1906) was a Liberal Party Member of Parliament in Auckland, New Zealand.

Biography

Early life
Shera was born in Ireland in 1840. He sailed to Australia in 1867 before continuing on to New Zealand a year later. He landed in Auckland and found work as a share broker. He married a daughter of Henry Balneavis, Jemima Balneavis, at St. Paul's Church in April 1873. His wife was part-Māori and Shera ensured that Māori women were included in the electoral reform bill that granted women's suffrage.

Political career

Shera represented the City of Auckland multi-member electorate from 1890 to 1893, when he was defeated. He had previously stood unsuccessfully in 1887 for the  electorate. He was a strong supporter of Sir George Grey.

He stood unsuccessfully in the 1902 election for the  seat as an Independent Liberal.

Later life and death
Shera died on 19 September 1906 at his residence in Remuera, Auckland.

Notes

References

1840 births
1906 deaths
New Zealand Liberal Party MPs
Unsuccessful candidates in the 1887 New Zealand general election
Unsuccessful candidates in the 1893 New Zealand general election
Unsuccessful candidates in the 1902 New Zealand general election
19th-century New Zealand politicians
Irish emigrants to New Zealand (before 1923)